Vyacheslav Mikolayovich Timchenko (born 16 August 1971), is a Ukrainian retired professional ice hockey player. He played for multiple teams during a career that lasted from 1987 until 2014. He also played internationally for the Ukrainian national team at several World Championships, as well as the 2002 Winter Olympics.

Career statistics

Regular season and playoffs

International

External links
 

1971 births
Living people
Bilyi Bars Bila Tserkva players
Buran Voronezh players
HC Berkut-Kyiv players
HC Neftekhimik Nizhnekamsk players
HK Gomel players
HK Vitebsk players
Hull Stingrays players
Ice hockey players at the 2002 Winter Olympics
Kompanion Kiev players
Lausitzer Füchse players
Olympic ice hockey players of Ukraine
ShVSM Kyiv players
Sokil Kyiv players
Soviet ice hockey defencemen
Sportspeople from Kyiv
Ukrainian ice hockey defencemen